Ulytau District is a district of Ulytau Region in central Kazakhstan. The administrative center of the district is the Auyl of Ulytau.  Population:

Geography
The Ulutau, a subrange of the Kazakh Uplands, extends across part of Ulytau District. Lake Karakoin is located in the district.

References

Districts of Kazakhstan
Ulytau Region
World Heritage Tentative List